Goh Liu Ying  (born 30 May 1989) is a Malaysian former badminton player. She has been consistently ranked among the top 10 mixed doubles player in the world with her partner, Chan Peng Soon. Together, they were ranked as high as world No. 3. They won the silver medal at the 2016 Summer Olympics.

Early life 
Goh was born on 30 May 1989 in Malacca to Goh Chak Whee and Yong Oi Lin. She has two younger brothers, Goh Qi Hao and Goh Qi Liang. Both of them study at SMK Munshi Abdullah in 5SN1. She first started training in badminton at the age of 10. She enrolled into the Bukit Jalil Sports School when she was 13 years old.

Career 
In 2009, Goh and Chan reached their first international tournament final at the Vietnam Open but were defeated by Flandy Limpele and Cheng Wen-hsing. At the 2009 Southeast Asian Games, she won gold in women's team event and bronze in mixed doubles event.

In 2010, they came to prominence when they won the Badminton Asia Championships after defeating South Korean's Yoo Yeon-seong and Kim Min-jung in the final. At the 2010 Commonwealth Games, she won the gold medal in mixed team event. In the mixed doubles event, Goh and Chan lost the bronze medal match to Chayut Triyachart and Yao Lei. At the 2010 Asian Games they lost in the first round to eventual winner, Shin Baek-cheol and Lee Hyo-jung.

In 2011, they were defeated by Indonesian pair, Tontowi Ahmad and Lilyana Natsir in the final of the Malaysia Open. They won the Bitburger Open by defeating Denmark's Thomas Laybourn and Kamilla Rytter Juhl.

In 2012, they became the first Malaysian mixed doubles pair to reach the semi-finals of the All England Open but lost to Tontowi Ahmad and Liliyana Natsir. In the following month, they became the runner-up of Australia Open after losing to Chinese Taipei's Chen Hung-Ling and Cheng Wen-Hsing in the final. They gained their first ever Malaysia Open crown by beating Indonesian pair, Irfan Fadhilah and Weni Anggraini.

Goh and Chan represented Malaysia at the 2012 Summer Olympics. They were the first ever Malaysian mixed doubles pair to qualify for the Olympic Games. They lost all three group matches and failed to progress to quarter-finals in their Olympics debut. In the same year, Goh and Chan won their first Super Series tournament at the Japan Open by beating Muhammad Rijal and Lilyana Natsir. In November 2012, they reached the final of China Open but were defeated by top seed, Xu Chen and Ma Jin in straight sets. They were ranked 3rd in the world at their career high at the end of 2012.

In 2014, Goh decided to undergo knee surgery to fix her aggravating right knee. While she was recovering, Goh enrolled into a modelling academy and did some modelling for the sports of badminton. After a total of 11-month hiatus due to recovery, Goh resumed her partnership with Chan in 2015.

They won three titles in 2015, the Polish Open, Russian Open and the Mexico Open. At the 2015 Southeast Asian Games, they won silver after losing to Indonesia's Praveen Jordan and Debby Susanto in a very tightly contested mixed doubles final. Goh also won silver in women's team event.

In 2016, they became the runner-up of the inaugural edition of Thailand Masters after losing to unseeded Chinese pair, Zheng Siwei and Chen Qingchen in the final. In March, they clinched their first title of the year by winning the New Zealand Open. In April, they were defeated by Indonesian pair, Tontowi Ahmad and Lilyana Natsir in the final of the Malaysia Open.

Goh and Chan qualified for the 2016 Summer Olympics. They won their first two group stage matches but lost the third to Indonesian pair, Tontowi Ahmad and Liliyana Natsir. They finished as group runner-up and progressed to the quarter finals round. In the quarter finals, they beat Group B winner, Robert Mateusiak and Nadieżda Zięba of Poland. In the semi-finals, they beat China's Xu Chen and Ma Jin in straight games to reach the final.

In the final, they had to settle for silver medal after they were beaten by Tontowi Ahmad and Liliyana Natsir for the second time in the tournament. Despite the fact that Goh and Chan lost in the final, they made history as the first Malaysian mixed doubles pair to claim an Olympic medal.

In March 2017, Goh and Chan become the first Malaysian mixed doubles pair to reach the All England Open final since 1955. In the final, Goh and Chan were defeated by 5th seed Lu Kai and Huang Yaqiong in 3 sets after a few controversial fault calls by the umpire against them. In April, Chan and Goh had to withdraw from the semi-final of India Open due to Goh's illness. They later suffered a first round loss to Edi Subaktiar and Gloria Emanuelle Widjaja in the Malaysia Open.

In May 2017, Goh announced that she had an aggravating injury in her right shoulder and thus, she went to Halle in Germany for surgery. She spent weeks to undergo her rehabilitation in Halle before returning to Malaysia in early July when she released her autobiography entitled I am Goh Liu Ying. In November 2017, Goh partnered with Chen Tang Jie to win the India International Series.

In January 2018, Goh resumed her partnership with Chan and they won the Thailand Masters. At the 2018 Commonwealth Games, she won the silver medal in mixed team event and the bronze medal in mixed doubles event.

In December 2018, she announced her resignation from Badminton Association of Malaysia with her current partner Chan Peng Soon. She also participated in Purple League 18/19 with Tang Chun Man in mixed doubles. Chan and Goh had grabbed their first title in 2019 Thailand Masters after their resignation from BAM.

In July 2021, Goh with her partner Chan competed at the 2020 Summer Olympics, but was eliminated in the group stage.

On 6 December 2021, Goh partner Chan announced in his Instagram post that Chan-Goh have decided to split up after 13 years of playing badminton together. BWF World Tour Finals 2021 was the last games Chan-Goh played. Ong Yew Sin later became Goh's new partner and the planned German Open will be their first tournament together.

Retirement
In November 2022, Goh announced her plans to retire after competing at the 2023 Malaysia Open. Teaming up again with Chan Peng Soon, they lost 21-18, 15-21, 7-21 to the Indonesian pair of Rehan Naufal Kusharjanto and Lisa Ayu Kusumawati in the first round on 10 January 2023. Badminton Association of Malaysia organized a retirement ceremony for Goh at the Axiata Arena on 14 January 2023. An exhibition match featuring Goh, Tan Boon Heong, Koo Kean Keat, Chan Peng Soon, Cheah Liek Hou and Beiwen Zhang was held during the ceremony.

Personal life

Sponsorship
Both Goh and her partner Chan Peng Soon are appointed by Yobick Malaysia as their brand ambassadors.

Achievements

Olympic Games 
Mixed doubles

Commonwealth Games 
Mixed doubles

Asian Championships 
Mixed doubles

Southeast Asian Games 
Mixed doubles

BWF World Junior Championships 
Girls' doubles

BWF World Tour (4 titles, 2 runners-up) 
The BWF World Tour, which was announced on 19 March 2017 and implemented in 2018, is a series of elite badminton tournaments sanctioned by the Badminton World Federation (BWF). The BWF World Tour is divided into levels of World Tour Finals, Super 1000, Super 750, Super 500, Super 300 (part of the HSBC World Tour), and the BWF Tour Super 100.

Mixed doubles

BWF Superseries (1 title, 4 runners-up) 
The BWF Superseries, which was launched on 14 December 2006 and implemented in 2007, was a series of elite badminton tournaments, sanctioned by the Badminton World Federation (BWF). BWF Superseries levels were Superseries and Superseries Premier. A season of Superseries consisted of twelve tournaments around the world that had been introduced since 2011. Successful players were invited to the Superseries Finals, which were held at the end of each year.

Mixed doubles

  BWF Superseries Finals tournament
  BWF Superseries Premier tournament
  BWF Superseries tournament

BWF Grand Prix (5 titles, 4 runners-up) 
The BWF Grand Prix had two levels, the Grand Prix and Grand Prix Gold. It was a series of badminton tournaments sanctioned by the Badminton World Federation (BWF) and played between 2007 and 2017.

Mixed doubles

  BWF Grand Prix Gold tournament
  BWF Grand Prix tournament

BWF International Challenge/Series (2 titles, 1 runner-up) 
Mixed doubles

  BWF International Challenge tournament
  BWF International Series tournament

Awards and accolades

Honours

Honours of Malaysia 
  :
  Member of the Order of the Defender of the Realm (AMN) (2017)
  :
 Distinguished Service Star (BCM) (2016)

References

External links 

 
 Goh Liu Ying at Badminton Association of Malaysia
 
 

1989 births
Living people
People from Malacca
Malaysian sportspeople of Chinese descent
Malaysian female badminton players
Badminton players at the 2012 Summer Olympics
Badminton players at the 2016 Summer Olympics
Badminton players at the 2020 Summer Olympics
Olympic badminton players of Malaysia
Olympic silver medalists for Malaysia
Olympic medalists in badminton
Medalists at the 2016 Summer Olympics
Badminton players at the 2010 Commonwealth Games
Badminton players at the 2018 Commonwealth Games
Commonwealth Games gold medallists for Malaysia
Commonwealth Games silver medallists for Malaysia
Commonwealth Games bronze medallists for Malaysia
Commonwealth Games medallists in badminton
Badminton players at the 2010 Asian Games
Badminton players at the 2018 Asian Games
Asian Games competitors for Malaysia
Competitors at the 2007 Southeast Asian Games
Competitors at the 2009 Southeast Asian Games
Competitors at the 2015 Southeast Asian Games
Southeast Asian Games gold medalists for Malaysia
Southeast Asian Games silver medalists for Malaysia
Southeast Asian Games bronze medalists for Malaysia
Southeast Asian Games medalists in badminton
Members of the Order of the Defender of the Realm
21st-century Malaysian women
Medallists at the 2010 Commonwealth Games
Medallists at the 2018 Commonwealth Games